1995 Peach Bowl may refer to:

 1995 Peach Bowl (January), January 2, 1995, game between the NC State Wolfpack and the Mississippi State Bulldogs
 1995 Peach Bowl (December), December 30, 1995, game between the Georgia Bulldogs and the Virginia Cavaliers